Les Cinq Dernières Minutes (The Last Five Minutes) is a crime based French television series, created by Claude Loursais, broadcast from 1 January 1958 till 20 December 1996. The show was aired in four series on several channels.

The first series was broadcast in 56 episodes between 1 January 1958 and 7 November 1973 on RTF. After an intermediary series of four 90 minute episodes were broadcast from 19 July 1974 to 16 January 1975, a second 72 episode series was broadcast from 1975 to 1993, then a third 17 episode series from 1993 to 1996 was broadcast on Antenne 2.

Summary 

Les Cinq Dernières Minutes was the first long-running series about police inquiries on French television. Each episode is based on an investigation where the viewer, accompanied by Commissioner Inspector Antoine Bourrel and his assistant Deputy Dupuy, must find clues which will help find the culprit. The programme often takes place in unconventional environments or situations, such as at a racecourse, scrap dealers, the Eiffel tower or a commercial printing business.

At the beginning, the series was a gameshow, which was filmed in studio and broadcast live. Two selected viewers took part and had to guess who was guilty when inspector Bourrel said the famous line: "Good God! But it’s… Of course!". Each of the two contestants had the opportunity to repeat two parts of the show, which would also be seen by the audience at home. This famously happened during the pilot episode when glasses of Champagne were given out. In some of the original episodes, there was also participation from the viewers at home, but this was abandoned during the first series.

Cast 

Over time, many actors and personalities have featured on the show, including: Françoise Fabian, Guy Kerner, Ginette Leclerc, Rellys, Pierre Brasseur, Henri Virlogeux, Bernard Fresson, Henri Crémieux, Jacques Monod, Henri Vilbert, André Valmy, Robert Vattier, Serge Gainsbourg, Anémone, Jean Topart, Paul Le Person, Jess Hahn, Marie-Georges Pascal, Pierre Clémenti, Michel Robin, Paul Préboist, ...

The series also introduced many young actors to the audience, such as Yves Rénier. Marc Eyraud was the only actor to play in the first, intermediary and second series.

Series One 

 Raymond Souplex: Commissioner inspector Antoine Bourrel (1958-1973)
 Jean Daurand  : Deputy Dupuy
 Pierre Collet : Officer of the Police Judiciaire

Intermediary Series 

 Christian Barbier : Commissioner Le Carré (1974-1975)
 Jacques Bouvier : The Judge (1974)
 Marc Eyraud : Inspector Ménardeau (1974-1975)
 Henri Lambert : Inspector Lindet (1974)

Series Two 

 Jacques Debary : Commissioner Cabrol (1975-1992)
 Marc Eyraud : Inspector Ménardeau (1975-1992)
 Caroline Silhol : Commissioner Belmont (1988-1992)
 Marc Adjadj : Inspector Lamouri (1988-1992)
 Valérie Jonckeere : Daughter Georges Claisse

Series Three 

Pierre Santini : Commissioner Massard (1993-1996)

Pierre Hoden : Inspector Antoine Barrier (1993-1996)

Guest 
 Andrée Damant
 Artus de Penguern
 Aurélien Recoing
 Catherine Jacob
 Christine Citti
 Claire Maurier
 Claire Nadeau
 Claude Gensac
 Daniel Prévost
 Danièle Évenou
 Danièle Lebrun
 Dominique Blanc
 Fabienne Chaudat
 Francine Bergé
 François Marthouret
 François Perrot
 Françoise Bertin
 Ginette Garcin
 Jackie Sardou
 Laure Duthilleul
 Liliane Rovère
 Magali Clément
 Marthe Villalonga
 Myriam Boyer
 Pascale Roberts
 Philippe Nahon
 Pierre Arditi
 Tonie Marshall
 Valérie Vogt
 Véra Belmont
 Yves Rénier

Trivia 

This programme was extremely successful until the main actor Raymond Souplex left in November 1972. In recognition of his character, the following commissioners were no longer called Bourrel, but instead, Le Carré, Cabrol and Massard.

Besides Claude Loursais, many directors have written for this programme, notably Jean-Pierre Decourt, Bernard Hecht, Jean-Yves Jeudi, Guy Lessertisseur, Raymond Pontarlier and Guy Séligmann. The scripts for the first series were mostly written by Jean Cosmos, Fred Kassak and Louis C. Thomas

The theme music played (on trumpet by Pierre Thibaud) during the opening sequence is called Arsenic blues and was composed by Marc Lanjean.

The programme was referenced by Gotlib in many of his comic strips, Rubrique-a-brac. Raymond Devos also references it in one of his sketches, Ma dernière heure est arrivée.

References

External links
 

1950s French television series
1960s French television series
1970s French television series
1980s French television series
1990s French television series
1958 French television series debuts
1996 French television series endings